Sarah Imovbioh (born 24 May 1992) is a Nigerian basketball player for PEAC-Pécs and the Nigerian national team.

International career
She participated at the 2018 FIBA Women's Basketball World Cup.
she also participated at 2019 2019 Women's Afrobasket where she won gold with the Nigerian Female basketball team.

References

External links

1992 births
Living people
Centers (basketball)
Nigerian expatriate basketball people in Spain
Nigerian expatriate basketball people in the United States
Nigerian expatriate basketball people in Hungary
Nigerian women's basketball players
People from Abuja
South Carolina Gamecocks women's basketball players